Tomáš Sýkora (born November 20, 1978, in Přerov) is a Czech professional ice hockey player. He played with HC Zlín in the Czech Extraliga during the 2010–11 Czech Extraliga season.

References

External links

1978 births
Czech ice hockey forwards
PSG Berani Zlín players
Living people
Sportspeople from Přerov
HC ZUBR Přerov players
BK Mladá Boleslav players
HC Berounští Medvědi players
HC Slovan Ústečtí Lvi players
Hokej Šumperk 2003 players
HC Havířov players